Pelletier is a common surname of French origin.  Notable people with this surname include:

Anne-Marie Pelletier, French Bible scholar
Anne-Sophie Pelletier, French politician
Annie Pelletier, Canadian diver
Benoît Pelletier, Quebec Liberal Party minister and MNA in the National Assembly
Bronson Pelletier, Canadian actor
Bruno Pelletier, Canadian musician
David Pelletier, Canadian figure skater
Delphine Pelletier, French triathlete
Gérard Pelletier, Canadian journalist
Hélène Pelletier-Baillargeon, Canadian journalist and writer
Irvin Pelletier, Canadian politician
Jacques Peletier du Mans, French humanist, poet and mathematician
Jakob Pelletier, Canadian ice hockey player
Jared Pelletier, Canadian film director
J.D. Denis Pelletier, judge serving on the Canadian Federal Court of Appeal
Jean Pelletier, Canadian politician
Jean-Jacques Pelletier, Canadian philosopher and author
Jean-Marc Pelletier, Canadian hockey goaltender
Joel Pelletier, American artist, musician and writer
Madeleine Pelletier, French feminist and psychiatrist
Marie Denise Pelletier, francophone Canadian singer
Marie-Ève Pelletier, Canadian former tennis player
Narcisse Pelletier, Cabin boy abandoned on the coast of Cape York Peninsula in Australia in 1857 and spent 17 years among the Aborigines.
Nicolas Jacques Pelletier, French highwayman, first person executed by guillotine in France
Pedro Eugenio Pelletier, French-born Dominican Republic independence war commandant and national heroe.
Pierre-Joseph Pelletier, French chemist
Wilfrid Pelletier, Canadian orchestra conductor
Yannick Pelletier, Swiss chess player
Yves P. Pelletier, Quebec actor and comedian

Place names
Lac Pelletier No. 107, a rural municipality in the Canadian province of Saskatchewan.
Lac Pelletier, hamlet in the Canadian province of Saskatchewan.

See also 
Peletier (disambiguation)
 Peltier
 
 

French-language surnames
Occupational surnames